The Sugar Loaf Islands (often Sugarloaf;) are a collection of five small uninhabited islands and several sea stacks near Port Taranaki, New Zealand.

Ngā Motu was one of the first areas inhabited by descendants of Te Whiti o Rongomai, and the islands and reefs were all named by Ngāti Te Whiti. The island group was given its English name in 1770 by James Cook because the reminded him of the way sugar was stored in heaps in Europe.

The Sugar Loaf Islands Marine Protected Area (SLIMPA) was established in 1991 to protect the area from oil exploration. This strengthened the protection that had been in place since the formation of a marine park in 1986.

In 2013 New Plymouth district councillors unanimously agreed to gift the protected area back to the government for treaty settlement negotiations with Taranaki and Te Āti Awa iwi.

Islands
The Sugar Loaf Islands can be divided into inner and outer island groups.

The inner islands comprise Mataora (Round Rock), Pararaki (Seagull Rock) and Motuotamatea (Snapper Rock). Mataora connects to the mainland at low tides as a tombolo, as does Motuotamatea on very low spring tides. Pararaki is separated from Mataora by a 20 meter wide channel.

The outer islands comprise Motumahanga (Saddleback Island) and Moturoa.

Several small rock outcrops are included in the island group. Waikaranga (Seal Rocks), and Tokatapu are several hundred meters offshore. Close to Moturoa lie Whareumu (Lion Rock), a vegetated stack and two barren rocks, and Tokomapuna (Barrett Reef).

Mikotahi

Mikotahi was formerly a half tide island, with a historic pā. In 1865 the Alpha well was drilled near Mikotahi. This was the first oil well in what is now the Commonwealth and one of the first in the world. The earth works to reclaim land for the New Plymouth Power Station reduced the island's size and permanently connected it to the mainland. There is a trig site on what remains to this day, Mikotahi point.

Mikotahi had a neighbouring stack that was connected to the mainland at the base of Paritutu. The people from Moturoa called it Fishing Rock. With caves, rockpools and surrounding beaches it was mostly destroyed from excavations for the power station cooling water inlet and land reclamation for the site.

Blasting Moturoa Island and Wharemu (Lion Rock) for rock.

In the early 20th century Moturoa and Whareumu (Lion rock) were blasted with explosives in the hope to connect the islands to Mikotahi and the growing port at Moturoa. After this was abandoned focus turned to mining Paritutu.

The appearance of the two Islands was changed greatly as a result of this work.

Human Habitation

Mataora, Motu-o-Tamatea, Moturoa Island and Mikotahi were hunting, fishing and gathering grounds and places of refuge for local inhabitants and the Taranaki and Te Āti Awa for hundreds of years.

Marine protected area

In 1986, an area encompassing the Sugar Loaf Islands was protected as a marine park. Concern over oil exploration led to strengthening of the protection, through the enacting of the Sugar Loaf Islands Marine Park Act in 1991. The act deemed Moturoa Island, Motumahanga, Waikaranga, and Whareumu as sanctuary areas (requiring a permit for entry), with the remaining area a conservation park. Reef heron, Little blue penguin, New Zealand Fur Seal, and Orca are monitored species. The islands are on migration routes for oceanic birds and cetaceans (whales and dolphins).

In 2008, the 1404 ha Tapuae Marine Reserve was established adjacent to the Sugar Loaf Island Marine Protected Area (SLIMPA).

Geology

The Sugar Loaf Islands, along with onshore pinnacles such as Paritutu, represent the oldest volcanic activity on the Taranaki peninsula. Dating between 1.7 and 1.74 million years of age, the islands are believed to be the remains of a ring fracture or feeders to eroded volcanic vents, and are composed of a porphyritic hornblende andesite. Volcanic activity in Taranaki subsequently shifted to Kaitake (580,000 years ago), then migrated southeast to Pouakai (230,000 years ago) and the current centre of activity, Taranaki (last erupted in 1755).

The Sugar Loaf Islands are the type locality of taranakite, a phosphate mineral that forms from the reaction of bird guano with the aluminous rocks comprising the islands. This was the first new mineral species to be discovered in New Zealand.

See also

 List of islands of New Zealand
 List of islands
 Desert island

References

External links
Map of the Sugar Loaf Islands Marine Protected Area and Tapuae Marine Reserve, DOC

Islands of Taranaki
Volcanoes of Taranaki
Marine reserves of New Zealand
Stacks of New Zealand
Uninhabited islands of New Zealand
Volcanic islands of New Zealand
Volcanic plugs of New Zealand
Pleistocene volcanoes
New Plymouth